The Attacker class were a class of escort aircraft carriers in service with the British Royal Navy during the Second World War.

With an increasing need for convoy escorts in the North Atlantic eleven of these were transferred to the Royal Navy, and reclassified as Attacker class, under the terms of the Lend-Lease program.

The ships were originally intended to serve as convoy escort carriers, equipped with both anti-submarine and fighter aircraft, and transport carriers, transferring new and replacement aircraft to forward bases. During successful use during the amphibious invasion of North Africa to cover advancing ground units until land airbases were secured, several ships were refit as strike carriers, equipped with just fighter aircraft. When used as convoy escorts, the ships' aircraft were successful in deterring German submarines from attacking Allied convoys, with a number of German submarines and aircraft destroyed or damaged by the aircraft. Eight of the ships ended the war in the Far East in the campaigns against the Japanese Empire and were then used to transport home prisoners of war.

All eleven ships survived the war and were eventually returned to the United States Navy, which sold eight of them for conversion back into merchant ships. The other three ships were scrapped.

Design and description
After the Attack on Pearl Harbor, the US Navy acquired 22 C3 merchant ships that were in varying states of construction, to be converted into escort carriers. They were all laid down in 1941 and 1942, with Ingalls Shipbuilding and Western Pipe & Steel building four each and Seattle-Tacoma Shipbuilding Corporation erecting the additional three, and supplied under the terms of the Lend-Lease program.

The ships had a standard complement of 646 officers and ratings. Crew accommodations were significantly different from the normal for the Royal Navy at the time. Instead of food being prepared by separate messes, it was cooked in the galley and served cafeteria-style in a central dining area. Unlike British-built ships, they were equipped with air conditioning, a modern laundry and a barber shop. The traditional hammocks were replaced by three-tier bunk beds, with 18 to a cabin, which were hinged and could be tied up to provide extra space when not in use.

All the escort carriers had the capacity for up to 20 anti-submarine or fighter aircraft, which could be a mixture of the British Hawker Sea Hurricane, Supermarine Seafire, and Fairey Swordfish, and the American Grumman Wildcat, Vought F4U Corsair and Grumman Avenger. The exact composition of the embarked squadrons depended upon the mission. Some squadrons were composite squadrons for convoy defence, and would be equipped with anti-submarine and fighter aircraft, while other squadrons working in a strike-carrier role would only be equipped with fighter aircraft. When utilised in ferry service the ships could carry up to 90 aircraft between both the flight and hangar decks. Aircraft facilities consisted of a small combined bridge–flight control on the starboard side above the flight deck that measured . Because the elevators were placed at the ends of the flight deck, pulleys were required for handling planes on and off of the elevators on the hangar deck, which was difficult in normal conditions, and impossible in rough seas.

The ships were delivered with /51 calibre guns mounted on sponsons located on either side of the stern. These were replaced with older /50 calibre Mk 9 surface guns because they were compatible with British ammunition. The ships' anti-aircraft (AA) defence consisted of eight  Bofors AA guns in twin mounts, and eight  Oerlikon AA cannon in twin and ten in single mounts as the standard fit. In practice all the ships had slightly different weapons mounted. Attacker, Chaser, and Hunter only had four single 20 mm AA cannon, the rest being double mounts. Of the other ships, Battler had two, Stalker had six, and Fencer had seven single 20 mm cannon. Pursuer had four extra 40 mm AA guns, and Striker had six extra in place of twin 20 mm mounts.

Service history

Convoy escorts

Escort carriers were designed to accompany other ships, forming the escort for convoys. The anti-submarine aircraft employed were initially Fairey Swordfish and later Grumman Avengers, which could be armed with torpedoes, depth charges,  bombs, or the RP-3 rocket projectile. As well as carrying out their own attacks on U-boats, these aircraft identified target locations for the convoy's escorts to attack. Typically anti-submarine patrols would be flown between dawn and dusk. One aircraft would fly about  ahead of the convoy, while another patrolled astern. Patrols would last between two and three hours, using both radar and visual observation in their search for U-boats. By 1944, it was usual to have two escort carriers working as a pair on convoy escort. Experience had shown it was best to have two composite squadrons. One squadron included fighters and the by then obsolete Fairey Swordfish equipped with air-to-surface vessel (ASV) radar for night patrols. The other squadron would be equipped with fighters and the Grumman Avenger for long-range day patrols, as they could not be fitted with the ASV radar.

The Fleet Air Arm squadrons flying off the Attacker-class escort carriers did have some successes of their own. For the rest of the day Chasers Fairey Swordfish kept the U-boats at bay by identifying their locations to her escorts. They also damaged two other U-boats themselves. Three other U-boats sighted managed to evade an attack in foggy conditions.

The carriers' aircraft could also claim some success against the Luftwaffe's long-range bombers. On 1 December 1943, two Grumman Wildcats from 842 Naval Air Squadron on board Fencer shot down a Focke-Wulf Fw 200 that was spying on Convoy OS 60. The next confirmed air-to-air success came on 24 February 1944, when four Grumman Wildcats from 881 Naval Air Squadron on board Pursuer were scrambled after the ship's radar had identified at least three aircraft approaching. The approaching bombers consisted of a mixed force of seven Focke-Wulf Fw 200 and Heinkel He 177s carrying glider bombs. One Fw 200 and one He 177 were shot down by Grumman Wildcats. The rest of the Germans kept their distance due to the combined efforts of the fighters and the ships' anti-aircraft fire.  Off Cape Finisterre in March 1944, Grumman Wildcat fighters from Pursuer shot down a Heinkel He 177 and a Focke-Wulf Fw 200, and damaged a Fw 200.See also 

On board Striker was 824 Naval Air Squadron with twelve Fairey Swordfish IIs, ten Grumman Wildcat Vs, and two spares. The Grumman Wildcats shot down a Blohm & Voss BV 138 on 22 August. For Operation Neptune from 5 June 1944 to the middle of the month, five all-fighter escort carriers, including Fencer, provided air cover to protect the anti-submarine groups on the flanks of the Normandy invasion fleet.

Strike operations

The five carriers were expected to keep a fighter aircraft force of 22 Supermarine Seafires over the landing area until the ground forces had seized an Italian airfield for use by ground-based aircraft. On the first day, 9 September 1943, they flew 265 sorties. They had expected to be relieved by 10 September, but a suitable airfield was not captured until 12 September. Of the carriers' 105 fighters, ten were lost in action and 33 written off in accidents. In exchange, they claimed two German aircraft destroyed and four others probably destroyed. For the landings in the south of France on 15 August 1944, Attacker, Stalker, and Hunter, each equipped with 24 Supermarine Seafires and Pursuer, with 24 Grumman Wildcats, formed part of the aircraft carrier force dubbed Task Force 88.

The success of the Allied navies against U-boats in the Atlantic forced the Germans to move some of them into the Indian Ocean. Their objective was to locate and destroy the U-boats and their supply ships and protect the shipping lanes between India, Aden, and South Africa. In March 1944, one of Battlers planes sighted the German supply ship Brake and three surfaced U-boats. They guided the Roebuck to the supply ship, which was scuttled by her captain. The three U-boats submerged before the start of the action.

The Hellcats carried out attacks on the anti-aircraft defences and the Wildcats attacked the Tirpitz with machine gun fire, just prior to the Fairey Barracudas bombing run. Tirpitz was hit multiple times during the attack, killing over 100, and wounding over 300, of her crew. There was some damage to her superstructure but no bombs pierced the armoured deck.See also 

On 26 April 1944, Pursuers aircraft successfully attacked a German convoy off Bodø in northern Norway. The convoy consisted of four merchant ships and five escorts; of these, all the merchant ships and one of the escorts were bombed and three of the merchant ships were set on fire. At the same time, other aircraft bombed and set on fire a large merchant ship at Bodø Harbour.See also 

On 6 May 1944, while on an anti-shipping sweep in the same area, Grumman Wildcats of 882 Naval Air Squadron from Searcher shot down two Blohm & Voss BV 138 seaplanes.

Early in 1944, the trend was for the strike carrier to move eastwards. Firstly Attacker, Hunter, and Pursuer were sent to the Aegean Sea to conduct operations against Axis garrisons in the area. They then moved to the Indian Ocean, joining Fencer and Stalker in supporting the Allied armies in Burma. Here they supported the Fourteenth Army amphibious landings and interdicted Japanese shipping in the Bay of Bengal and the Straits of Malacca. As the war in the east progressed, the British and U.S. Pacific fleets combined. Two more Attacker-class ships arrived in the area, Chaser and Striker. These were used to ferry replacement aircraft for the other carriers, and after the Japanese surrender were given another role: repatriating prisoners of war.

When the war was over, the surviving Lend-Lease ships were returned to the U.S. Navy, which now had a surplus of these ships, so some were sold into merchant service. HMS Attacker became Costel Forte, HMS Chaser Aagtekerk, HMS Fencer Sydney, HMS Hunter Almdijk, HMS Ravager Robin Trent, HMS Searcher Captain Theo, HMS Stalker Rionw, and HMS Tracker Corrientes. The other three Attacker-class ships, HMS Battler, HMS Pursuer, and HMS Striker, were not sold into merchant service; all three were scrapped between 1946 and 1948.

Battle honours
All eleven ships were awarded battle honours by the Royal Navy.
 HMS Attacker: Atlantic 1943–1944, Salerno 1943, South France 1944, Aegean 1944
 HMS Battler: Atlantic 1942–1945, Salerno 1943
 HMS Chaser: Atlantic 1943, Arctic 1944, Okinawa 1945
 HMS Fencer: Atlantic 1943–1944, Norway 1944, Arctic 1944
 HMS Hunter: Atlantic 1942–1944, Salerno 1943, South France 1944, Aegean 1944, Burma 1945, Malaya 1945
 HMS Pursuer: Atlantic 1943–1945, Norway 1944, Normandy 1944, South France 1944, Aegean 1944, Atlantic 1944, Norway 1945, Arctic 1945
 HMS Ravager: Atlantic 1943
 HMS Searcher: Atlantic 1943–1944, South France 1944, Aegean 1944, Norway 1944–1945
 HMS Stalker: Atlantic 1943–1944, Salerno 1943, South France 1944, Aegean 1944, Burma 1945
 HMS Striker: Atlantic 1943–1944, Arctic 1944, Norway 1944, Okinawa 1945
 HMS Tracker: Atlantic 1943–1944, Arctic 1944, Normandy 1944

Notes

References

External links
 Part 1, BATTLESHIPS, BATTLE CRUISERS, MONITORS, FLEET CARRIERS, ESCORT CARRIERS

 
 
Escort aircraft carrier classes